The Secret of Bastow Manor is a 1983 graphic adventure game for the VIC-20 and Commodore 64 published by SoftGold in 1983. The Commodore 64 version is formally titled The Secret of Bastow Manor 64.

The graphics use PETSCII characters and the game is written in BASIC.

References

External links

Darryl Reynolds Official Site 

1983 video games
Adventure games
Commodore 64 games
VIC-20 games
SG-1000 games
Video games developed in the United States